Steam is a live album by jazz saxophonist Archie Shepp recorded at the East-West Jazz Festival in Nuremberg, West Germany on May 14, 1976 and released on the Enja label.

Reception
The Allmusic review by Scott Yanow states: "The avant-garde innovator Shepp still sounds pretty strong at what was for him a fairly late period, displaying his distinctive raspy tone and what were for him some typically emotional ideas".

Track listing
 "A Message from Trane" (Cal Massey) - 18:58
 "Solitude" (Eddie DeLange, Duke Ellington, Irving Mills) - 11:40
 "Invitation" (Bronisław Kaper, Paul Francis Webster) - 14:29 Bonus track on CD
 "Ah-Leu-Cha" (Charlie Parker) - 8:06 Bonus track on CD
 "Steam" (Archie Shepp) - 9:23
 "52nd Street Theme" (Thelonious Monk) - 0:57
Recorded at the East-West Jazz Festival in Nuremberg, West Germany on May 14, 1976

Personnel
Archie Shepp - tenor saxophone, piano
Cameron Brown - bass
Beaver Harris - drums

References

1976 live albums
Archie Shepp live albums
Enja Records live albums